is a traditional school (koryū) of Japanese martial arts founded in the early 16th century by Tatsumi Sankyo.

History

Tatsumi Sankyo was born in what is now Ehime Prefecture, Japan, on Shikoku island. He is thought to have been active as a warrior (bushi) in the Eishō Era (1504–1520). Tatsumi trained in the martial arts from an early age. As a result, he was never defeated, either on the battlefield or in single combat. As a young man, Tatsumi was dissatisfied with mere technical proficiency, or even victory in combat, and secluded himself in prayer to the mountain deity (kami) Tsumayama Daimyojin. Through intense , Tatsumi gained enlightenment (satori) in the sword arts going beyond superficial levels of purely physical achievement. He then formulated the Tatsumi-ryū as a result of his experiences in light of his new understanding.

Curriculum

The central weapon of Tatsumi-ryū is the katana, and training to use the sword in combat constitutes the largest part of the curriculum. The use of other weapons, such as the spear (yari), glaive (naginata), long staff (rokushaku-bō), and short staff (hanbō), is undertaken with the aim of enabling the swordsman to defeat such weapons. Indeed, the studies of naginata, rokushaku-bō, and hanbō are classified as part of the swordsmanship (kenjutsu) curriculum and are not considered as separate areas of study. Therefore, in the practice of pre-determined exercises with partners (kata) these weapons always "lose" to the sword.

The school also contains a large curriculum for unarmed grappling arts (which Tatsumi-ryū refers to as yawara, rather than jujutsu).
The yawara syllabus includes training for combat both in and out of armour, and covers a wide range of techniques and situations. The curriculum includes also a number of weapons for which there are no kata, but which are referred to in Tatsumi-ryū's scrolls (makimono). This includes the baton (jutte), throwing blade (shuriken), iron fan (tessen), and weighted chain (manriki-gusari).

Authorized teachers 

During the Edo period, Tatsumi-ryū was widely practiced among the samurai of the Hotta clan's domain, which is centered on present day Sakura, Chiba. Today Hiroshi Kato (Kato Hiroshi, born 1944) is recognized as the 22nd grandmaster (sōke) of Tatsumi-ryū. Outside Japan, Liam Keeley, of Melbourne, Australia, is the only individual who both holds advanced teaching licenses (mokuroku) for Tatsumi-ryū as well as being an authorized teacher for Tatsumi-ryū. Pierre and Claire Simon (France) and Jaime Gamundi (Spain) are also authorized to teach the Tatsumi-ryū curriculum.

Notes

References
Bexis, Dennis (2007) "Budo in the 'Burbs: Liam Keeley, student of the Koryu martial arts", Blitz 21(8), pp. 58–62.
Keeley, Liam (1997) "Kato Takashi: Reflections of the Tatsumi-ryu Headmaster" in Diane Skoss (ed.) Koryu Bujustsu: Classical Warrior Traditions of Japan (Berkeley Heights, N.J.: Koryu Books), pp. 143–153.
Keeley, Liam (1999) "The Tojutsu of the Tatsumi-ryu, Murphy's Law, and the K.I.S.S. Principle" in Diane Skoss (ed.) Sword and Spirit: Classical Warrior Traditions of Japan, Volume 2 (Berkeley Heights, N.J.: Koryu Books), pp. 111–149.
Skoss, Meik and Diane Skoss (1999) "Field Guide to the Classical Japanese Martial Arts" in Diane Skoss (ed.) Sword and Spirit: Classical Warrior Traditions of Japan, Volume 2 (Berkeley Heights, N.J.: Koryu Books), pp. 59–87.

External links 
Tatsumi-ryu websites
 Tatsumi-ryu Japanese Homepage  
  Liam Keeley Sensei - Tatsumi-ryu in Australia at the Melbourne Koryu Kenkyukai
 Pierre & Claire Simon - Oshinkan  Translating in progress

Online articles
 Liam Keeley's thoughts on practicing two classical traditions: Chen Style Taijiquan and Tatsumi-ryu heiho
 More information on Tatsumi-Ryu from The International Hoplology Society

Ko-ryū bujutsu
Japanese martial arts